Charles Möeller (born April 30, 1967) is a Brazilian actor, theatre director, stagecraftsman and costume designer. Alongside his fellow Cláudio Botelho, he is regarded as responsible for the revival of the musical theatre in Rio de Janeiro from the middle of the 1990s to present day.

Works

Stagecraft and costume designer
 O Concílio do Amor
 Boi Voador
 Hello Gershwin (directed by Marco Nanini)
 O Alienista
 Dorotéia (1991)
 De Rosto Colado (1993, directed by Marco Nanini)
 O Médico e o Monstro (1994)
 O Jovem Torless (1995)
 Exorbitâncias, uma Farândula Teatral (1995)
 Os Fantástikos (1996)
 Futuro do Pretérito (1996)
 Na Bagunça do Teu Coração (1997, directed by Bibi Ferreira)
 Volúpia (1997)
 O Casamento (1997)
 Amor de Poeta (1998)
 Auto da Compadecida (1998)
 Gula (1999)
 Os Libertinos (2000)
 Candide (2000)

Theatre direction
 As Malvadas (1997)
 O Abre Alas (1998)
 Cole Porter - Ele Nunca Disse que Me Amava (2000)
 Company (2001)
 Um Dia de Sol em Shangrilá (2001)
 A Diabólica Moll Flanders (2002)
 O Fantasma do Teatro (2002)
 Suburbano Coração (2002)
 Ópera do Malandro (2003)
 Sweet Charity (2005)
 Lado a Lado com Sondheim (2005)

Awards
 Prêmio Shell of Best Costume Designer for O Casamento (1997)
 Prêmio Sharp of Best Play for As Malvadas (1997)

References

 Charles Möeller in Itaú Cultural. Retrieved on June 13, 2007.

1967 births
Living people
People from Santos, São Paulo
Brazilian theatre directors
Brazilian male stage actors
Brazilian scenic designers